Hilmar Kabas (born 6 January 1942 in Vienna) is an Austrian politician of the Freedom Party of Austria (FPÖ).

Kabas studied law at the University of Vienna. He was mainly active as a local politician in Vienna and held the position of the state party leader between 1998 and 2004.

References 

1942 births
20th-century Austrian politicians
21st-century Austrian politicians
Living people
Ombudsmen in Austria
Freedom Party of Austria politicians
University of Vienna alumni